Piet Bakker may refer to:

Piet Bakker (writer) (1897–1960), Dutch journalist and author
Piet Bakker (canoeist),  Dutch sprint canoeist